Lists of former United States citizens cover citizens of the United States who were denaturalized, or stripped of their nationality, and citizens who chose to relinquish their nationality.

Lists
List of denaturalized former citizens of the United States
List of former United States citizens who relinquished their nationality
Quarterly Publication of Individuals Who Have Chosen to Expatriate, a U.S. government publication listing the names of certain former U.S. citizens

See also
National Instant Criminal Background Check System, a non-public FBI gun control database which includes people who have renounced U.S. citizenship
Relinquishment of United States nationality
Emigration from the United States